Bucaspor Ladies Football Team is the women's football team of Bucaspor in Buca, İzmir, Turkey.

Established in 2005, Bucaspor is playing in the Turkish Women's Football Premier League since the 2007–09 season. The team was runner-up in the seasons 2007–08 and 2008–09.

Stadium
The team play their home matches in the Seyit Mehmet Özkan Facility in Buca.

Statistics

Notable former players
 Bilgesu Aydın (2005–2011)
 Ezgi Çağlar (2006–2009)
 Hanife Demiryol (2006–2011)
 Gamze İskeçeli (2006–2009)
 Melis Özçiğdem (2006)

See also
 Turkish women in sports

Bucaspor
Association football clubs established in 2005
Women's football clubs in Turkey
2005 establishments in Turkey